Following is a list of municipal presidents of Tonalá, in the Mexican state of Jalisco:

References 

Tonalá, Jalisco